The eighth edition of the Women's Asian Amateur Boxing Championships were held from November 2 to 10, 2017 in Ho Chi Minh City, Vietnam.

Medal summary

Medal table

References

External links
amateur-boxing

Asian Amateur Boxing Championships
Asian Boxing
Boxing
Boxing Championship